Carlene M. Walker is an American politician and businesswoman from Utah. A Republican, she was a member of the Utah State Senate, representing the state's 8th senate district in Salt Lake County, from 2001 to 2009. Later she was chairwoman of the state DUI committee.
Walker received her bachelor's degree from Brigham Young University in 1969.

Walker received her bachelor's degree from Brigham Young University in 1969.

References 

1947 births
Living people
Brigham Young University alumni
Republican Party Utah state senators
Women state legislators in Utah
21st-century American politicians
21st-century American women politicians